Final results for the water polo tournament at the 1936 Summer Olympics:

Medal summary

Results

Elimination rounds

In the first round each team in a group played each other team in the same group. The placings were determined on points. If the points were equal, then the better goal average decided. The first two teams of each group were qualified for the semi-finals, while the third and fourth placed team was eliminated.

Group 1

Group 2

Group 3

Group 4

Semi-finals
As in the elimination round each team in a group played each other team in the same group unless they had met in the previous round. In this case the previous result stood and was carried forward to this group. So in each group only four matches had to be played. The placings were determined on points. If the points were equal, then the better goal average decided. The first two teams of each group were qualified for the final round, while the third and fourth placed team were eliminated and took part in a consolation tournament.

The results which are carried forward from the first round are shown in italics.

Group 1

Group 2

Final round
As in the rounds before each team in the final played each other team unless they had met in a previous round. In this case the previous result stood and was carried forward to the final. So in the final only four matches had to be played. The placings were determined on points. If the points were equal, then the better goal average decided.

The results which are carried forward from the previous rounds are shown in italics.

Final Group

Hungary won the Olympic Championship because their goal average was better (10/2 = 5) than Germany's (14/4 = 3.5).

Group for fifth to eighth places - consolation tournament

Participating nations
Each country was allowed to enter a team of 11 players and they all were eligible for participation. All teams entered 11 players.

A total of 142(*) water polo players from 16 nations competed at the Berlin Games:

 
 
 
 
 
 
 
 
 
 
 
 
 
 
 
 

(*) NOTE: There are only players counted, which participated in one game at least.

Not all reserve players are known.

Summary

References

Sources
 PDF documents in the LA84 Foundation Digital Library:
 Official Report of the 1936 Olympic Games, v.2 (download, archive) (pp. 345–356)
 Water polo on the Olympedia website
 Water polo at the 1936 Summer Olympics (men's tournament)
 Water polo on the Sports Reference website
 Water polo at the 1936 Summer Games (men's tournament) (archived)

 
1936 Summer Olympics events
1936
1936 in water polo
1936